Acritoscincus is a genus of Australian skinks (family Scincidae). It belongs to the Eugongylus group; the genus Oligosoma appears to be a fairly close relative. An alternative name is Bassiana.

Species
Acritoscincus duperreyi (Gray, 1838) -- eastern three-lined skink, bold-striped cool-skink
Acritoscincus platynotus (Peters, 1881) -- red-throated cool-skink, red-throated skink
Acritoscincus trilineatus (Gray, 1838) -- southwestern cool-skink, western three-lined skink, New Holland skink

References

 
Taxa named by Richard Walter Wells
Taxa named by Cliff Ross Wellington
Lizard genera